Appalachia is a cultural region associated with the Appalachian Mountains in the eastern United States.

Appalachia may also refer to:

Appalachian (disambiguation)
Appalachia (Mesozoic), a Mesozoic-era island
Appalachia, Virginia, a town in the U.S. state of Virginia
Appalachia, a rhapsody by Frederick Delius
Appalachia (journal), a mountaineering and conservation journal published by the Appalachian Mountain Club since 1894
Appalachia arcana, a genus of grasshoppers in the Acrididae family

See also
 Apalachin, New York